Abdul Halim Sharar (4 September 1860 – 1 December 1926) was an Indian author, playwright, essayist and historian from Lucknow. He left behind, in all, hundred and two books. He often wrote about the Islamic past and extolled virtues like courage, bravery, magnanimity and religious fervour. Malikul Azia Vārjina (1889), Firdaus-e-Bareen (1899), Zawāl-e-Baghdad (1912), Husn kā Daku (1913–1914), Darbar-e-Harampur (1914) and Fateh Maftūh (1916) are some of his famous novels.

His book Guzishta Lucknow is still considered one of the best narratives describing the genesis of the city and its culture of Lucknow. "جویائے حق" "Juya-e-Haq" is one of his lesser known works, it's the story of Salman the Persian, one of Muhammad's companions. 
It is based on the letters of Salman to Bahira a Christian religious figure in Syria, about his journey to Madina to find the last prophet and description of the Muhammad and his dealings.  
Abdul Haleem Sharar added the original text of letters in biography of Salman the persian.

Early life 
Abdul Halim Sharar was born in Lucknow in 1860. His father Hakim Tafazzul Husain was a scholar of Islamic religion and Persian literature. Sharar was educated at home where he learnt Arabic and Persian. After spending the first nine years of his life at Lucknow, Sharar joined his father at Matiya Burj in Calcutta in 1869, who was in the court of the exiled King of Awadh, Wajid Ali Shah. Sharar remained at Matiya Burj till 1879, and he also contributed to the columns of the Urdu newspaper Avadh Akhbar as its Matiya Burj correspondent. He started learning Greek medicine system but did not finish it. In 1880 Sharar married his first cousin.

Works 
فردوس بریں This Historical content tells us when a new sect was tried to invent and was named فرقہ باطنیہ (Sect of Spirituality) and their leaders conspired to rule out Islam and they established highly secret society and they created artificial Paradise. They would make people stunned by their network of spies. They would sneak up a person's personal life and would pretend to tell the hidden (غیب) then that person would become their devotee and would do anything they would demand. History shows they captured a lot of people and made them to kill many renowned people and Scholars (علماء). According to history Halaku Khan (ہلاکو خان) son of Ganges Khan or Changez Khan in Urdu چنگیز خان found these people and he disposed of them all. He authored a magazine dil gudaaz initially from Luckhnow and later from Hyderabad where he was in the service of Nizam of Hyderabad.

Bibliography 

 Firdaus-e-Bareen
 Hasan Angelina (1889)
 Guzishta Lucknow
 Malikul Aziz Varjinia (1889)
 Mansur Mohana (1890)
 "Philpana"
Asray Qadeem

Firdaus Bareen

Islami Swaneh Umriaan

Darbar-E- Harampur

Afsana Qais...

Afsana e Mateen...

Agha Sadiq Ki Shadi...

References

1869 births
1926 deaths
Indian Shia Muslims
19th-century Indian historians
20th-century Indian historians
Scientists from Lucknow
19th-century Indian dramatists and playwrights
20th-century Indian dramatists and playwrights
Dramatists and playwrights from Uttar Pradesh
Scholars from Uttar Pradesh